Emelyn Thatcher Whiton (née Leonard, later Righter, March 1, 1916 – March 1, 1962) was an American sailor.

Emelyn Leonard was born in New York City. In 1939 she married Herman Whiton, who was helmsman of the American boat Llanoria which won the 6 metre class at the 1948 Olympics. Herman repeated the feat at the 1952 Olympics with the same boat and a different crew, including his wife as an alternate. Since she had not participated in the Olympic regatta she did not receive a medal.

Emelyn divorced Herman Whiton in 1957 and married Brewster Righter in 1958. She died in the plane crash of American Airlines Flight 1 in Jamaica Bay, on her 46th birthday.

References

External links
 
 
 

1916 births
1962 deaths
American female sailors (sport)
Olympic gold medalists for the United States in sailing
Sailors at the 1952 Summer Olympics – 6 Metre
Victims of aviation accidents or incidents in 1962
Victims of aviation accidents or incidents in the United States
Accidental deaths in New York (state)
Sportspeople from New York City
20th-century American women
20th-century American people